The Netherlands participated in the Eurovision Song Contest 1997 with the song "Niemand heeft nog tijd" written by Ed Hooijmans. The song was performed by the group Mrs. Einstein, which was internally selected by the Dutch broadcaster Nederlandse Omroep Stichting (NOS) to represent the Netherlands at the 1997 contest in Dublin, Ireland. Mrs. Einstein's appointment as the Dutch representative was announced on 26 October 1996, while the national final Nationaal Songfestival 1997 was organised in order to select the song. Six songs competed in the national final on 23 February 1997 where "Niemand heeft nog tijd" was selected as the winning song following the combination of votes from twelve regional juries and a public vote.

The Netherlands competed in the Eurovision Song Contest which took place on 3 May 1997. Performing during the show in position 8, the Netherlands placed twenty-second out of the 25 participating countries, scoring 5 points.

Background 

The Dutch least successful result has been last place, which they have achieved on four occasions, most recently in the 1968 contest.

The Dutch national broadcaster, Nederlandse Omroep Stichting (NOS), broadcasts the event within the Netherlands and organises the selection process for the nation's entry. The Netherlands has used various methods to select the Dutch entry in the past, such as the Nationaal Songfestival, a live televised national final to choose the performer, song or both to compete at Eurovision. However, internal selections have also been held on occasion. In 1996, NOS has organised Nationaal Songfestival in order to select both the artist and song for the contest. For 1997, the broadcaster opted to select the Dutch artist through an internal selection, while Nationaal Songfestival was continued to select the song.

Before Eurovision

Artist selection
Following Maxine and Franklin Brown's seventh place in 1996 with the song "De eerste keer", the Dutch broadcaster internally selected the artist for the Eurovision Song Contest. On 26 October 1996, NOS announced that they had selected the group Mrs. Einstein to represent the Netherlands at the 1997 contest. It was revealed on the same day that their Eurovision song would be selected through the national final Nationaal Songfestival 1997.

Nationaal Songfestival 1997 
A submission period was opened by the Dutch broadcaster following the artist announcement where composers were able to submit their songs until 6 December 1996. 350 songs were received by the broadcaster at the closing of the deadline and six competing songs were selected. The final took place on 23 February 1997 at the Marcanti Plaza in Amsterdam, hosted by Bart Peeters and Joop van Zijl and was broadcast on TV2. All six competing songs were performed by Mrs. Einstein and the winning song, "Niemand heeft nog tijd", was selected by the 50/50 combination of a public televote and the votes of twelve regional juries. The viewers and the juries each had a total of 336 points to award. Each jury group distributed their points as follows: 1, 2, 3, 5, 7 and 10 points. The viewer vote was based on the percentage of votes each song achieved. For example, if a song gained 10% of the vote, then that entry would be awarded 10% of 336 points rounded to the nearest integer: 37 points. In addition to the performances of the competing songs, Herman van Molle, Jacques d'Ancona, Lisa Riley, Petra Hoost and past Dutch Eurovision entrants Corry Brokken (1956/1957/1958), Heddy Lester (1977), Gerard Joling (1988) and Maxine and Franklin Brown (1996) were also present during the show.

At Eurovision 

According to Eurovision rules, the twenty-four countries which had obtained the highest average number of points over the last four contests competed in the final on 3 May 1997. On 28 November 1996, a special allocation draw was held which determined the running order and the Netherlands was set to perform in position 8, following the entry from Switzerland and before the entry from Italy. The Dutch conductor at the contest was Dick Bakker, and the Netherlands finished in twenty-second place with 5 points.

Heading into the final of the contest, RTÉ reported that bookmakers ranked the entry 23rd out of the 25 entries. The show was broadcast in the Netherlands on TV2 with commentary by Willem van Beusekom as well as via radio on Radio 2. The Dutch spokesperson, who announced the Dutch votes during the show, was 1957 Dutch Eurovision winner as well as 1956 and 1958 entrant Corry Brokken.

Voting 
Below is a breakdown of points awarded to the Netherlands and awarded by the Netherlands in the contest. The nation awarded its 12 points to the United Kingdom in the contest.

References

External links 
 Netherlands preselection 1997

1997
Countries in the Eurovision Song Contest 1997
Eurovision